Änne Koken (28 May 1885, Hanover - 19 April 1919, Hanover) was a German artist. In addition to landscapes and still-lifes, she designed stained glass, clothing and decorative book covers. She also worked as a commercial artist, notably for the firms Bahlsen and Günther Wagner (a pharmaceutical company, now a division of Pelikan AG).

Biography 
Her father was the painter and engraver, . She presumably took her first art lessons from her father, then studied at the "School for Painting and Decorative Art" in Munich with Hans Eduard von Berlepsch-Valendas, at a time when actual art in advertising was still a new idea.

In 1909, she designed the lobster trademark for the food company,  which, in a slightly modernized form, is still in use today. A Year later, she opened her own studio in Hannover. Over the next few years, she helped the company establish its image. She worked for them until her death. After 1912, she designed clothing, hats, and textile pieces that appeared in the magazine Neue Frauenkleidung und Frauenkultur (New Women's Clothing and Culture), which was published until the 1930s. 

By 1914, her works were being shown in exhibitions of more conventional art, including that of the Deutscher Werkbund. She was also elected a board member at the Museum August Kestner. As a member of the "Vereins für Deutsche Frauenkleidung und Kultur" (Association for German Women's Clothing and Culture), she campaigned for women's rights.

In 1919, she died of pneumonia; two weeks after giving birth to her daughter.

References

Further reading 
 
 Nekrolog Änne Koken (obituary). In: Der Cicerone, XI, 1919.
 Christof Sprengemann: Änne Koken. In: Neue Frauenkleidung und Frauenkultur, 1919
 Hugo Thielen: KOKEN, (1) Änne, in: Hannoversches Biographisches Lexikon, S. 206f.
 Gerda Breuer, Julia Meer, Julia (Eds.): Women in Graphic Design, Jovis / Berlin, 2012, pgs.487 and 489.

External links 

 Lecture by Babette Kaiserkern on the life and works of Änne Koken

1885 births
1919 deaths
German designers
German illustrators
Deaths from pneumonia in Germany